Rhagio tringarius, common name marsh snipefly, is a species of fly from the family Rhagionidae.

Description
The abdomen and the long slender legs are yellow-orange. The patterning on the abdomen is quite variable, but usually it shows black well spaced dorsal triangles. Also the last abdomen tergites are black. Wings are clear, as this fly lacks the dark wing stigma common in the genus Rhagio.

Ecology
The larvae of this snipefly dwell in the ground, on litter and detritus.  They are predatory hunters, feeding on small beetles and earthworms. Adults occur from May to September, usually resting on leaves.

Distribution and habitat
This species is present in most of European countries. It can be found in wet meadows, hedgerows woods and areas with a rich vegetation.

References

External links

 BugGuide
 Commanster

Rhagionidae
Brachyceran flies of Europe
Flies described in 1758
Taxa named by Carl Linnaeus